Brachycerus barbarus is a species of family Curculionidae, subfamily Brachycerinae.

Description 
The pronotum and elytra are black, with strong longitudinal ridges. These weevils feed on the medicinal squill (Drimia maritima).

Distribution 
This species occurs in France, Italy, Portugal, Spain and in North Africa.

References 

Brachycerinae